Southampton Football Club is an English football club based in Southampton, Hampshire. The club was founded in 1885 and has competed in the English football league system from 1920. Since their first qualification to major European cup competition in 1969, they have participated in the Inter-Cities Fairs Cup, the European Cup Winners' Cup, the UEFA Europa League and the Texaco Cup. The club qualified for European Football after the 2014–15 season through their league position for the first time since 1984.

History

1961–62 Anglo-French Friendship Cup
The Anglo-Franco Friendship Cup was a short-lived Inter-League competition that lasted for two seasons. The format had four teams from England competing against four teams from France. Individual clubs could not win the competition outright, so whatever countries' teams claimed the most aggregate wins overall would be declared the best league and win the trophy. The draw for the 1961–62 competition was; Saints v Bordeaux, Blackburn v Nancy, Lens v Cardiff, and Derby v Béziers.

Southampton lost 2–3 on aggregate, but the English League won 2–1 in aggregate victories (with one tied).

1969–70 Inter-Cities Fairs CupThe Saints' maiden European voyage was the 1969–70 Inter-Cities Fairs Cup, which they took part in with fellow English clubs Newcastle United, Liverpool and eventual winners Arsenal. Southampton's first opponents were Norwegian side Rosenborg. Despite losing 1–0 away, a comfortable 2–0 win at home in the second leg put Southampton into a Second Round tie with Portuguese side Vitória de Guimarães. A closely fought 3–3 away draw was followed by a 5–1 home win which saw them through to the last 16 where Southampton were drawn against fellow English side Newcastle United. A 0–0 away and 1–1 result at home meant that Southampton failed to progress to the Quarter-Finals after losing out on away goals.

First roundSouthampton won 2–1 on aggregate.Second roundSouthampton won 8–4 on aggregate.Third roundSouthampton lost 1–1 on aggregate after the away goals rule.1971–72 UEFA Cup
After finishing seventh in the previous season, Southampton qualified for European competition for the second time in two years. Drawn in the First Round against Athletic Bilbao, the Saints came from behind to win the first leg 2–1. However a fortnight later, they lost 2–0 away after conceding a late goal which confirmed their exit from the competition.

First roundSouthampton lost 3–2 on aggregate.1974–75 Texaco Cup
After being relegated to the Second Division the previous season, Southampton qualified for the final instance of the short lived Texaco Cup. Alongside 15 other English teams split into four groups of Round Robin format, the top two from each group would progress to the Quarter-Finals where they would be drawn against Scottish opposition. Southampton's group consisted of West Ham, Luton Town and Leyton Orient which they topped after being undefeated. The knockout stages were a two-legged affair and Southampton were drawn a tough fixture against Rangers F.C. but managed to win convincingly 5–1 on aggregate despite playing away in front of 35,000. The semi final against Oldham Athletic proved just as routine with Southampton winning 5–2 over the two legs which progressed them through to the final against Newcastle United. Despite winning the first leg, the previous season's FA Cup winners proved the gap between divisions was too large for Southampton to overcome and won the tournament with two goals in extra time.

Group stages

Quarter finalSouthampton won 5–1 on aggregate.Semi finalSouthampton won 5–2 on aggregate.FinalSouthampton lost 3–1 on aggregate after extra time.1976–77 European Cup Winners' Cup
Despite being in the Second Division, Southampton caused a huge upset in the 1976 FA Cup Final by beating Manchester United 1-0. This qualified the Saints for the European Cup Winners' Cup competition where they were drawn in the first round against Olympique Marseille who had won the Coupe de France the previous season. Although suffering an away defeat, a 4–0 victory at home saw them through to the Second Round. Southampton travelled to Carrick Rangers of Northern Ireland who had won the Irish Cup to qualify for the tournament. A 9–3 aggregate win progressed high-scoring Southampton into the Third Round against Belgian Cup champions R.S.C. Anderlecht. Despite levelling the aggregate score to 2-2 in the second leg, Southampton conceded late on to be eliminated from the tournament. Anderlecht went on to reach the Final.

First roundSouthampton won 5–2 on aggregate.Second roundSouthampton won 9–3 on aggregate.Quarter-finalsSouthampton lost 3–2 on aggregate.1981–82 UEFA Cup
Southampton qualified for the UEFA Cup for the third time after finishing sixth in the First Division the previous season. In the First Round, the Saints travelled to Ireland for the first time to play Limerick F.C., after a convincing 3–0 win and a 1–1 draw at home Southampton were through to the Second Round against Sporting Clube de Portugal. Despite a very respectable 0–0 away in Lisbon, the home defeat proved too much to overcome and Southampton were eliminated from the competition.

First roundSouthampton won 4–1 on aggregate.Second roundSouthampton lost 4–2 on aggregate.1982–83 UEFA Cup
Southampton qualified for a European Cup competition in successive seasons for the first time and played Swedish team IFK Norrköping in the First Round. A 2–2 draw at The Dell meant that they exited the tournament on the away goals rule after a 0–0 result in Sweden.

First roundSouthampton lost 2–2 on aggregate after the away goals rule.1984–85 UEFA Cup
In the 1983–84 Season, Southampton recorded their best ever finish in the First Division as runners up to Liverpool, just three points behind. In the First Round of the UEFA Cup, they drew German opponents Hamburger SV. Despite a 0–0 draw at home in the first leg, Southampton were unable to claim victory in Hamburg and eventually lost 2–0.

First roundSouthampton lost 2-–0 on aggregate.2003–04 UEFA Cup
After almost two decades absent from European competition, Southampton qualified for the UEFA Cup after finishing runners up in the 2003 FA Cup Final. It was the first time that St. Mary's Stadium hosted a competitive European match. Following on from a 1–1 draw at home, Southampton conceded late on in Romania and found themselves eliminated from the First Round for the third time in a row.

First roundSouthampton lost 2–1 on aggregate.2015–16 UEFA Europa League
Since the winners of the 2014–15 FA Cup, Arsenal, and winners of the 2014–15 Football League Cup, Chelsea, qualified for the Champions League based on league position, the spot awarded to the FA Cup winner (Europa League group stage) was passed to the sixth-placed team, Liverpool, and the spot awarded to the League Cup winner (Europa League third qualifying round) was passed to the seventh-placed team, Southampton. The draw for the Third Round was held on 17 July 2015, Southampton drew Dutch team Vitesse Arnhem who finished fifth in the previous season of the Eredivisie.

Vitesse (30 July and 6 August 2015)
Southampton entered the 2015–16 UEFA Europa League in the third qualifying round. Their first game took place against Dutch side Vitesse Arnhem on 30 July 2015, which the Saints won 3–0 at St Mary's Stadium. Graziano Pellè found the net first in the 36th minute to put Southampton one up, before Dušan Tadić scored a penalty just before half time. Substitute Shane Long finished the scoring late in the second half to win the game for the home side. In the second leg Southampton won 2–0, therefore advancing to the play-off round 5–0 on aggregate. Pellè scored again to put the Saints up in the fourth minute, with Sadio Mané doubling his side's lead just a minute before the end of the match.

Midtjylland (20 and 27 August 2015)
In the qualifying play-off round, Southampton faced FC Midtjylland. In the first leg the Saints drew 1–1 with the Danish champions, with Jay Rodriguez equalising after Tim Sparv's opener on the stroke of half-time. In the second leg, Midtjylland striker Morten Rasmussen scored the only goal of the game to ensure the Danish side won 2–1 on aggregate to eliminate Southampton from the competition.

Third qualifying roundSouthampton won 5–0 on aggregate.Play-off roundSouthampton lost 2–1 on aggregate.''

2016–17 UEFA Europa League

Since the winners of the 2015–16 Football League Cup, Manchester City qualified for the 2016–17 UEFA Champions League through their league position, the spot normally awarded to the League Cup winner was passed down to the team who finished in sixth place in the 2015–16 Premier League, Southampton. This was the first time that Southampton had participated in the Europa League Group Stage and on 26 August 2016, were drawn into Group K alongside Internazionale, Sparta Prague and Hapoel Be'er Sheva.

Sparta Prague (15 September 2016)

Southampton entered the 2016–17 UEFA Europa League at the group stage, when they were drawn in Group K with Internazionale, Sparta Prague and Hapoel Be'er Sheva. In the opening match against Sparta Prague on 15 September 2016, the Saints picked up their first win of the season when they beat the Czech side 3–0. Charlie Austin opened the scoring with a fifth-minute penalty, before doubling his side's lead 20 minutes later with a header. Jay Rodriguez scored a third in added time at the end of the match to send Southampton to the top of the group.

Hapoel Be'er Sheva (29 September 2016)
In their second match of the tournament, the Saints were held to a goalless draw at Israeli champions Hapoel Be'er Sheva. The game did not feature many goalscoring opportunities for either side in the first half, which Hapoel largely dominated, although James Ward-Prowse had a number of chances on goal after the break. The home side came closest to winning the game in the second half through Maor Melikson and Ben Sahar chances, however the deadlock stayed unbroken and both sides remained on level points at the top of the group table.

Internazionale (20 October 2016)
On 20 October 2016 the Saints travelled to the San Siro to face Internazionale, losing 1–0 to the Italian side. The visitors almost scored on a number of occasions in the first half, notably when Ward-Prowse's shot went over the crossbar and Cuco Martina's went wide of the post. Antonio Candreva scored the only goal of the game in the 67th minute, before Marcelo Brozović received a second booking and was sent off ten minutes later. However, Southampton could not take advantage of the extra player and succumbed to their first defeat in the tournament.

Internazionale (3 November 2016)
Southampton hosted Internazionale on 3 November 2016, winning 2–1 to secure second in the group K table. After Inter captain Mauro Icardi opened the scoring in the 33rd minute, the Saints were awarded a controversial penalty for a handball by Ivan Perišić just before half time, while Antonio Candreva was booked for an off-the-ball incident involving Sam McQueen. Dušan Tadić's penalty was saved by Samir Handanović, before the half ended with more drama between the players of both sides. The hosts increased the pressure in the second half, leading to defender Virgil van Dijk equalising in the 64th minute with a shot in the box following a corner. Less than five minutes later, Southampton went ahead as Yuto Nagatomo turned Tadić's cross into the Internazionale goal. Southampton held on and almost scored a third for an historic win.

Sparta Prague (24 November 2016)
On 24 November, Southampton lost at Sparta Prague by a single goal to remain second in the group. Despite dominating possession for most of the match, the Saints enjoyed few clear chances and went behind early on when defender Costa Nhamoinesu scored a volley from close range following a free kick, which was poorly defended by the Premier League club. Goalkeeper Fraser Forster made a number of saves to deny further goals, which Prague threatened to score later on in the game. The result left Southampton needing a goalless draw or win over Hapoel Be'er Sheva in the final group stage game in order to proceed to the knockout stages.

Hapoel Be'er Sheva (8 December 2016)
Southampton were knocked out of the UEFA Europa League on 8 December 2016 when they drew 1–1 with Hapoel Be'er Sheva at St Mary's Stadium. Despite the home side dominating much of the possession and having many more chances on goal, it was the visitors who took the advantage in the 78th minute when Maor Buzaglo scored the Israeli side's only shot on target after poor defending from the Saints, who were left needing two goals in just over ten minutes in order to advance to the knockout stages. Defender Virgil van Dijk pulled one back in stoppage time, and Maya Yoshida came close to winning the game with a last-minute header, but the game ended level and Hapoel finished the group in second place.

Group stage

Overall record

References

English football clubs in international competitions
Southampton F.C.